Willis Augustus "Ching" Lee Jr. (May 11, 1888 – August 25, 1945) was a vice admiral of the United States Navy during World War II. Lee commanded the American ships during the second night of the Naval Battle of Guadalcanal (November 14–15, 1942) and turned back a Japanese invasion force headed for the island. The victory ended Japanese attempts to reinforce their troops on Guadalcanal, and thus marked a turning point in both the Guadalcanal Campaign and the Pacific War.

Lee was also a skilled sport shooter, and won seven medals in the 1920 Olympics shooting events, including five gold medals, tied with teammate Lloyd Spooner for the most anyone had ever received in a single game. Their record stood for 60 years. He was the most successful athlete at the 1920 Olympics.

Early life
The son of Judge Willis Augustus Lee and Susan Arnold, he was known as "Mose" Lee to family and friends.

He entered the U.S. Naval Academy in 1904. While at the Naval academy, his Chinese-sounding last name, compounded by his fondness for the Far East earned him the moniker "Ching" Lee.

Following graduation, Lee joined the academy's rifle team twice. He was assigned to the battleship  from October 1908 to May 1909, before returning to the naval academy and re-joining the rifle team. From November 1909 until May 1910, Lee served aboard the protected cruiser , and then transferred to the gunboat . Upon being detached back to the United States, Lee re-joined the Academy shooting team a third time. In July 1913, Lee re-joined Idaho, and in April 1914 he transferred to the battleship  to participate in the occupation of Veracruz.

1920 Olympics

Lee participated in 14 events at the 1920 Summer Olympics in Antwerp. He won 7 medals (5 gold, 1 silver, and 1 bronze), all in team events. His teammates for the various events were Dennis Fenton, Lawrence Nuesslein, Arthur Rothrock, Oliver Schriver, Morris Fisher, Carl Osburn, Lloyd Spooner, and Joseph Jackson.

Lee and Spooner ended the 1920 Olympics with 7 medals each, the most anyone had ever received in a single year's games. Boris Shakhlin was the next person to reach 7, in 1960. It would not be until Alexander Dityatin in the 1980 games that anyone would beat the record.

Interwar years
Lee attended the Naval War College in the late 1920s, and was promoted to the rank of captain in 1936.

During the 1930s and early 1940s, Lee was several times assigned to the Fleet Training Division, commanded the light cruiser , and served on the staff of Commander, Cruisers, Battle Force. In early 1942, following his promotion to the rank of rear admiral, Lee became Assistant Chief of Staff to the Commander in Chief, U.S. Fleet.

World War II
Lee's specialty in life was gunnery. At the age of 19 in 1907 "he became the only American to win both the US National High Power Rifle and Pistol championships in the same year." In 1914 during the Veracruz campaign in Mexico he drew the fire of three enemy snipers, thereby exposing their positions and then shot them at long range.  He understood the powerful guns of a battleship as an extension of the law of ballistics and adapted his expertise to the new age of technology.  When Admiral Lee engaged the Japanese Vice Admiral Nobutake Kondō's battleship  on the evening of 14 November 1942 in the waters off Guadalcanal, he became naval history's first battleship commander to conduct a "gunfight" primarily by radar remote control.

Naval Battle of Guadalcanal

Flying his flag in Washington, Lee engaged an Imperial Japanese Navy surface fleet under the command of Vice Admiral Kondō  during the second night of the Naval Battle of Guadalcanal on the night of 14–15 November 1942. While riding in the battleship Washington, which served as his flagship during this sea fight, Lee's battleship decisively shelled the battleship Kirishima into a wreck, resulting in her scuttling shortly afterwards. With 300 Imperial sailors still entombed within her hull, she slid into Ironbottom Sound, leaving Admiral Lee's flagship Washington the only American battleship during World War II to sink an enemy battleship in a "one on one" gunfight.

Lee, who "knew more about radar than the radar operators", used the SG radar installed aboard Washington to skillfully maneuver his ships during the night.

After Guadalcanal
Lee was awarded the Navy Cross for his actions at the battle, promoted to vice admiral in 1944 and placed in charge of the Pacific Fleet's fast battleships, as Commander, Battleships, Pacific Fleet (ComBatPac).

In May 1945, he was sent to the Atlantic to command a special unit researching defenses against the threat of Japanese kamikaze aircraft, the Composite Task Force, U.S. Atlantic Fleet. While serving in that position on 25 August 1945, Vice Admiral Lee died suddenly after suffering a heart attack, ten days after the Surrender of Japan. He collapsed and died in a motor launch that was ferrying him out to his flagship, the gunnery training ship USS Wyoming (AG-17), in the harbor of Portland, Maine. Lee was buried in Arlington National Cemetery.

Family
Willis Lee Jr. was a distant relative of Confederate General Robert E. Lee and  the third Attorney General of the United States, Charles Lee. He married Mabelle Allen Elspeth (1894–1949) on July 14, 1919. They had no children.
Willis' father, Judge Willis Augustus Lee Sr., was one of fourteen children of Nathaniel Wiley Lee (aka Nat Lee, founder of Natlee) and Frances Abbott, of Owen County, Kentucky. While in the Pacific theater, Lee unofficially adopted two Korean children in Vietnam after the children's family requested that Lee take the children to the United States.

His great-grandparents were early Kentucky settlers, Joseph R. Lee and Mary Wiley. His grandfather Nathaniel W. Lee operated a distillery at his namesake village of Natlee. In 1893, Nat Lee's sour mash whiskey was taken to the Chicago World's Fair where it won the Gold Medal over 5000 other entries.

Namesakes
The  , redesignated before commissioning as a destroyer leader (DL-4), was named for him.

Awards and decorations
Below is the ribbon bar of Vice Admiral Willis Augustus Lee:

See also
List of multiple Olympic gold medalists

References

Citations

Bibliography

Further reading
 

1888 births
1945 deaths
People from Owen County, Kentucky
United States Navy vice admirals
Navy Midshipmen rifle shooters
American male sport shooters
United States Navy personnel of World War I
United States Navy World War II admirals
Shooters at the 1920 Summer Olympics
Olympic gold medalists for the United States in shooting
Olympic silver medalists for the United States in shooting
Olympic bronze medalists for the United States in shooting
Medalists at the 1920 Summer Olympics
United States Distinguished Marksman
Recipients of the Navy Cross (United States)
Recipients of the Navy Distinguished Service Medal
Recipients of the Legion of Merit
Burials at Arlington National Cemetery